Betty Taylor may refer to:

 Betty Taylor (athlete) (1916–1977), Canadian Olympic athlete
 Betty Taylor (actress) (1919–2011), American actress and performer
Betty Taylor (community advocate) (born 1949), Australian community advocate and domestic violence prevention campaigner
 Betty Loo Taylor (1929–2016), American jazz pianist and musician
 Betty Blayton Taylor (1937–2016), American activist, artist and lecturer

See also 
 Elizabeth Taylor (disambiguation)